The following is a list of the television networks and announcers that have broadcast the WNBA All-Star Game.

2020s

2010s

Notes
No official All-Star Game was held in 2010. Instead, there was an exhibition game matching the USA national team against a WNBA All-Star team, with Team USA winning 99–72 at Mohegan Sun Arena. And as previously mentioned, no games were held at all in 2012 and 2016 due to the Summer Olympic games.

2000s

Notes 
In June 2007, the WNBA signed a contract extension with ESPN. The new television deal runs from 2009 to 2016. A minimum of 18 games will be broadcast on ABC, ESPN, and ESPN2 each season; the rights to broadcast the first regular-season game and the All-Star Game are held by ABC. Additionally, a minimum of 11 postseason games will be broadcast on any of the three stations. Along with this deal, came the first-ever rights fees to be paid to a women's professional sports league. Over the eight years of the contract, "millions and millions of dollars" will be "dispersed to the league's teams".
In 2004, the game was not played in its usual format due to the WNBA players competing in the 2004 Summer Olympics in Athens, Greece. That year, the USA national team defeated a team of WNBA All-Stars 74-58 at Radio City Music Hall.  This game is officially considered to be an exhibition rather than an All-Star Game. The league also took a month-long break to accommodate players and coaches who would be participating in the summer games. The tradition of not playing the WNBA All-Star Game during an Olympic year has continued in 2008, 2012, and 2016 (along with the tradition of taking a month-long break during the regular season.)

1999

See also
List of WNBA Finals broadcasters
List of current Women's National Basketball Association broadcasters
List of NBA All-Star Game broadcasters

References

External links
And They Say It Gets Colder: WNBA All-Stars Low on ABC
Episode List: WNBA All-Star Game - TV Tango

 
ABC Sports
ESPN announcers
All-Star Game
All-Star Game